Quintus Egnatius Proculus ( – after 210) was a Roman aristocrat.

Life
It is speculated that he was the son of Quintus Egnatius Proculus. He was suffect consul in the nundinium of an unknown year. He is known from an inscription that also mentions his wife Maria Aureliana Violentilla, the daughter of an unknown consular.

References

Suffect consuls of Imperial Rome
Proculus, Quintus
190 births
3rd-century deaths
2nd-century Romans
3rd-century Romans